The siege of Lille, or Lille pocket, (28–31 May 1940) took place during the Battle of France in the Second World War.

The III Corps of the First Army had managed to retreat to the Lys river with the British Expeditionary Force (BEF) divisions nearby. The two surrounded French corps resisted German attacks until forced to surrender at midnight on 31 May/1 June. The defence of the Lille Pocket enabled more Allied troops to retreat into the Dunkirk perimeter and take part in the Battle of Dunkirk.

Prelude
During the morning of 27 May, the 1st Panzer Division attacked Gravelines on the western side of the Dunkirk perimeter and cut off the garrison and its commander,  Bertrand Fagalde was captured; the remaining French fought on. To the south, German panzers crossed the river Aa and other German troops advanced on Wormhoudt. Two panzer divisions crossed La Bassée Canal and overran the British 2nd Division. The 7th Panzer Division rushed the gap and reached the X Armeekorps, cutting off the Allied troops in Lille. On the night of  the BEF divisions near Lille were able to retreat over the Lys but only the three infantry divisions of the III Corps ( Léon de la Laurencie) of the French First Army (General René Prioux) managed to get away. Many of the French units that had retreated from much further south were still in the salient around Lille when the 6th Army ( Walther von Reichenau) surrounded the city.

Siege

The forces in Lille, commanded by  Jean-Baptiste Molinié, were fortunate that a patrol captured  (Lieutenant-General) Fritz Kühne, commander of the 253rd Infantry Division and recovered documents showing the positions of the German troops surrounding the city. Molinié used the information to plan a breakout for 28 May.
At  the IV Corps ( André Boris) and V Corps (General Darius Bloch) attempted to break out on the west side of Lille and retreat towards the Lys. The  (2e DINA, Major-General Pierre Dame) tried to cross the Deûle river over the bridge to Sequedin (just south of Lomme). The  (5e DINA, Major-General Augustin Agliany) tried to escape over the Moulin Rouge bridge on the Santes road, south of Haubourdin. Another attempt was made during the morning of 29 May; the Germans had mined the bridge but two French tanks and two companies of infantry got across but were then forced back.

Molinié and five divisions of the First Army fought from house to house in the suburbs of Lille, German troops trying to infiltrate the French defences through gaps and among the many civilian refugees stranded in the city. On 29 May, the 15e DIM surrendered; with food and ammunition dwindling, Molinié and Colonel Aizier negotiated a surrender and hostilities ended at midnight on Friday 31 May/Saturday 1 June. Molinié, another   troops surrendered to the Germans at the Grand Place. The German commander, General Alfred Wäger, allowed the French the honours of war; the garrison paraded through the Grand Place, as German troops stood to attention, a compliment for which Wäger was reprimanded.

Aftermath

Some parties of French troops managed to get out of the pocket; Capitaine Philippe de Hauteclocque, the chief of staff of the 4e DI escaped and reached the 7e Armée on the Somme. By the time of the surrender, Operation Dynamo, the Dunkirk evacuation had been running for a week. In The Second World War (1949), Winston Churchill described the Allied defence of Lille as a "splendid contribution" that delayed the German advance for four days and allowed the escape of the British Expeditionary Force from Dunkirk. William L. Shirer wrote in 1969 that the "gallant" defence of Lille "helped the beleaguered Anglo-French forces around the port to hold out for an additional two to three days and thus save at least 100,000 more troops". The defenders of Lille were the only garrison accorded honours of war during the campaign of 1940 and with the defenders of Fort Vaux during the Battle of Verdun in 1916, one of only two French garrisons to receive this distinction by Germany in both world wars.

Alistair Horne wrote in 1982 that the French defence of Lille enabled the BEF and the rest of the First Army to retreat into the Dunkirk perimeter and in 2013, Douglas Fermer wrote that the Battle of Lille diverted about seven German divisions during the evacuation of Dunkirk. In a 2016 publication, Lloyd Clark wrote that the French breakout attempts were doomed to fail but that the German besiegers had been held off for four days when the Dunkirk perimeter was being consolidated.  (Field Marshal) Walther von Brauchitsch blamed the halt order to the panzer divisions, issued by Hitler, for the delay; had the panzer forces been allowed to continue the pocket would have been sealed along the coast, preventing the Allied evacuation.

Casualties

Orders of battle

French
Commander:  Jean-Baptiste Molinié Data from Lloyd Clark (2016) unless specified.
 III Corps ( de La Laurencie)
 1e Division d'Infanterie Motorisée
 2e Division d'infanterie nord-africaine
 IV Corps ( André Boris)
 1e division d'infanterie marocaine
 15e Division d'Infanterie Motorisée ( Alphonse Juin)
 V Corps ( Darius Paul Bloch [Dassault])
 5e Division d'infanterie nord-africaine

German
 XXVII Corps ( Alfred Wäger)
 4th Panzer Division
 253rd Infantry Division
 XV (Motorised) Corps ( Hermann Hoth)
 5th Panzer Division
 7th Panzer Division
 XI Corps ( Joachim von Kortzfleisch)
 7th Infantry Division
 217th Infantry Division
 Army Group A Reserve
 267th Infantry Division

See also 

 List of French military equipment of World War II
 List of German military equipment of World War II

Footnotes

References

Further reading

 
 
 
 
 
 
 
 
 
 
 

Battle of France
History of Lille
Lille 1940
1940 in France
Lille
Lille (1940)
Lille (1940)
Lille
Lille
May 1940 events